Frédéric Garnier (born 11 March 1964) is a French former professional racing cyclist. He rode in the 1988 Tour de France.

References

External links
 

1964 births
Living people
French male cyclists
Sportspeople from Orléans
Cyclists from Centre-Val de Loire